John Thornell may refer to:
 John F. Thornell Jr., United States Air Force officer and World War II flying ace
 John Thornell (athlete), Australian long jumper